Mikkel Boe Følsgaard (born 1 May 1984) is a Danish actor. In 2012 he won the Silver Bear for Best Actor at the 62nd Berlin International Film Festival for his portrayal of King Christian VII in A Royal Affair, his feature film debut, while still studying at the Danish National School of Theatre and Contemporary Dance.

Personal life
In 2016, Følsgaard married Freja Friis, with whom he has a son (born October 2013) and a daughter (born December 2016).

He is the younger brother of photographer and director Nicolas Tobias Følsgaard.

Filmography

Film

Television

References

External links

1984 births
20th-century Danish male actors
21st-century Danish male actors
Living people
Danish male film actors
Danish male television actors
Silver Bear for Best Actor winners
Best Actor Bodil Award winners